Somethin' Groovy! is a 1967 studio album by Peggy Lee. It was released in 1967 on Capitol Records. It was arranged by Ralph Carmichael and Toots Thielemans is credited for harmonica.

Track listing
"Somethin' Stupid" (Carson Parks) - 2:31
"Makin' Whoopee" (Walter Donaldson, Gus Kahn) 	- 4:20
"You Must Have Been a Beautiful Baby" (Johnny Mercer, Harry Warren) - 1:52
"I Can Hear the Music" (Spence Maxwell, Gene DiNovi) - 1:54
"It Might as Well Be Spring" (Richard Rodgers, Oscar Hammerstein II) - 1:48
"Two for the Road" (Henry Mancini, Leslie Bricusse) - 2:47
"Release Me" (Eddie Miller, Robert Yount, Dub Williams) - 2:54
"Sing a Rainbow" (Arthur Hamilton) - 2:25
"No Fool Like an Old Fool" (Joseph McCarthy, Joseph Meyer) - 4:43
"Our Love Is Here to Stay" (George Gershwin, Ira Gershwin) - 2:46
"I'm Gonna Get It" (Peggy Lee, Georghe Romanis) - 2:42

References

1967 albums
Peggy Lee albums
Albums arranged by Ralph Carmichael
Albums produced by Dave Cavanaugh
Capitol Records albums